Mathura  Assembly constituency is  one of the 403 constituencies of the Uttar Pradesh Legislative Assembly,  India. It is a part of the Mathura district and one  of the five assembly constituencies in the Mathura Lok Sabha constituency. First election in this assembly constituency was held in 1957 after the "DPACO (1956)" (delimitation order) was passed in 1956. After the "Delimitation of Parliamentary and Assembly Constituencies Order" was passed in 2008, the constituency was assigned identification number  84.

Wards  / Areas
Extent  of Mathura Assembly constituency is PCs Jaisinghpura, Ganesara, Naugaon,  Maholi, Narholi, Mathura Bangar, Aurangabad, Dhangaon, Aduki of Mathura KC,  PCs 1Sakraya Bangar, Vrindaban of Vrindaban KC, Chhatikara, Jait, Vrindaban MB, Mathura MB  & Mathura (CB) of Mathura Tehsil. varun sharma

Members of Legislative Assembly

Election results

2022

2017

See also

Mathura district
Mathura Lok Sabha constituency
Sixteenth Legislative Assembly of Uttar Pradesh
Uttar Pradesh Legislative Assembly

References

External links
 

Assembly constituencies of Uttar Pradesh
Mathura district
Constituencies established in 1956